2020 Florida Amendment 1 is an amendment to the Constitution of Florida that passed on November 3, 2020 via a statewide referendum. The amendment changes the state constitution to make citizenship a requirement to vote in the state of Florida. Every county in the state voted in favor of the amendment.

Contents 
The amendment, which was present on all statewide ballots in the November 3, 2020 election, read as follows:No. 1 Constitutional Amendment Article VI, Section 2. This amendment provides that only United States Citizens who are at least eighteen years of age, a permanent resident of Florida, and registered to vote, as provided by law, shall be qualified to vote in a Florida election.

Results

See also
 2020 Alabama Amendment 1

References 

Florida_ballot_measures
Florida Amendment 1
Amendment 1
Citizen Requirement for Voting